The 1964–65 international cricket season was from September 1964 to April 1965.

Season overview

October

Australia in India

Australia in Pakistan

December

Pakistan in Australia

England in South Africa

Ceylon in India

January

Pakistan in New Zealand

February

New Zealand in India

March

Australia in the West Indies

New Zealand in Pakistan

References

International cricket competitions by season
1964 in cricket
1965 in cricket